The Year's Best Science Fiction: Thirteenth Annual Collection is a 1996 science fiction anthology edited by Gardner Dozois.  It is the 13th in the Year's Best Science Fiction series. It won the Locus Award for best anthology.

Contents

The book opens with a 39-page writeup by Dozois which summarizes and comments on major developments in science fiction literature and film in 1995. The main body of the book contains 24 stories (all originally published in 1995), an introduction by Dozois opening each story, and a 6-page referenced list of honorable mentions for the year. The stories included in the book are as follows.

Ursula K. Le Guin: "A Woman's Liberation"
Ian R. MacLeod: "Starship Day"
Robert Reed: "A Place with Shade"
Greg Egan: "Luminous"
Michael F. Flynn: "The Promise of God"
Pat Cadigan: "Death in the Promised Land"
Joe Haldeman: "For White Hill"
John Kessel: "Some Like It Cold"
Allen Steele: "The Death of Captain Future"
Maureen F. McHugh: "The Lincoln Train"
David Marusek: "We Were Out of Our Minds with Joy"
Michael Swanwick: "Radio Waves"
Greg Egan: "Wang's Carpets"
Mary Rosenblum: "Casting at Pegasus"
Dan Simmons: "Looking for Kelly Dahl"
James Patrick Kelly: "Think Like a Dinosaur"
Ursula K. Le Guin: "Coming of Age in Karhide"
Poul Anderson: "Genesis"
Nancy Kress: "Feigenbaum Number"
Geoff Ryman: "Home"
Terry Bisson: "There Are No Dead"
Paul J. McAuley: "Recording Angel"
William Sanders: "Elvis Bearpaw's Luck"
Brian Stableford: "Mortimer Gray's History of Death"

External links
Story synapses by Brian Davies (scroll down)

1996 anthologies
13
St. Martin's Press books